The Ambassador was a named train of the Baltimore and Ohio Railroad (B&O) on its route between Baltimore, Maryland and Detroit, Michigan with major station stops in Washington, D.C. and Pittsburgh, Pennsylvania and Toledo, Ohio.  Inaugurated in 1930, the Ambassador was discontinued in 1964.

History
 The B&O began passenger service from Detroit to Washington, D.C. in 1920. From Detroit to Toledo, it ran on the tracks of the Pere Marquette and Wabash railroads. Toledo south to Deshler, it ran on B&O tracks. Until 1925, the B&O offered a through Washington to Detroit Pullman sleeping car running on a Washington to Chicago train. At Deshler, Ohio the car was added to a Cincinnati to Detroit train.

In June 1925, the B&O started a through direct from Washington overnight train to Detroit named the Washington-Detroit Limited (although it actually originated in Baltimore).  This train operated coaches, a dining car, a lounge car, and sleepers. In 1930, this train was renamed The Ambassador.  The train typically used the cutoff through North Baltimore, Ohio skipping Deshler. Up through 1946, it operated into Fort Street Union Depot in Detroit, then B&O moved operations to the landmark Michigan Central Station.

In late 1961, as railroad passenger traffic was declining, The Ambassador became just a section of the combined Capitol Limited - Columbian. It had one coach, a sleeping car, and a combination sleeper-lounge. The train operated separately from Willard, Ohio to Detroit with a dining car added.

In 1964, The Ambassador name disappeared entirely, and the train was renamed the Capitol-Detroit. Now that the Chesapeake and Ohio Railroad had acquired control of the B&O, the train was rerouted over the C&O from Toledo to Fort Street Union Depot.

Notable incidents
On September 24, 1942 The Ambassador ran into the back of the Cleveland Express near Dickerson, Maryland northwest of Washington, DC.  Twelve passengers and two crewmen were killed in the worst accident that the B&O had suffered since 1907.

On the night of March 9, 1949, as the Ambassador was leaving Martinsburg, West Virginia, two young men riding on the train as passengers began robbing other passengers, then walked through the train and its diesel locomotives to the head end and forced the engineer to back the train back to a grade crossing, where they got off. The robbers then held up a nearby tavern, stole a car, and later caught a bus, winding up in Washington, DC, the next day.  Police, acting on a tip, arrested the two at a pawn shop, wounding one bandit who officers thought was drawing a gun (instead only reaching for an ID).  The story made national headlines, and the pair were subsequently sentenced to twenty years in federal prison.  Firsthand account from the head bandit, Luman Ramsdell, in book by author Wilson Casey, "Bedlam on the West Virginia Rails", 2015 History Press.

Stations

References

Passenger trains of the Baltimore and Ohio Railroad
Named passenger trains of the United States
Night trains of the United States
Passenger rail transportation in Maryland
Passenger rail transportation in Michigan
Passenger rail transportation in Ohio
Passenger rail transportation in Pennsylvania
Passenger rail transportation in Washington, D.C.
Railway accidents in 1942
Railway services introduced in 1930
Railway services discontinued in 1964